Herre is a village in Bamble municipality in Telemark, Norway. Herre lies on the western side of the Frierfjord, with road connections to Skien municipality and Rugdtvedt. As of January 1, 2018, the population is 1,356.

History
The Herre river was for a long time an important source of jobs for Herre. In the late 1600s, with the opening of the Bolvik ironworks, Herre was established as one of Telemark's oldest industrial societies. In the 1850s a coal mill was established by Hellestvedt. In the early twentieth century, Compagnie Française de Mines de Bamble (later known as Norwegian Bamble A/S) was established in Herre to mine the large apatite deposits. Compagnie Française de Mines de Bamble was at the time one of Norway's biggest industrial companies. In 1907 Bamble's first power station was opened at Kongens Dam. Bamble Cellulosefabrikk was also an important workplace for the people of Herre from 1888 to 1978.

Herre today
Today, Herre School provides grades 1-10 education.  During the 2018/19 school year, there were 156 pupils and 29 staff members, of which 15 were teachers. The school building was originally completed in 1953, but has been upgraded in recent years with a new gym.

One of the landmarks of Herre is the Herre church, built in 1905.

References

Villages in Vestfold og Telemark